The following is a chronological list of all those who have held the position of manager of the first team of PFC CSKA Sofia.

List of managers 

Key
*Served as caretaker manager.

References 

 List of managers at the CSKA Sofia fan page

CSKA Sofia
 
PFC CSKA
PFC CSKA